The 2016–17 NCAA Division II men's ice hockey season began on October 28, 2016 and concluded on February 25 of the following year. This was the 35th season of second-tier college ice hockey.

Regular season

Standings

See also
 2016–17 NCAA Division I men's ice hockey season
 2016–17 NCAA Division III men's ice hockey season

References

External links

 
NCAA